Kobern-Gondorf is a municipality in the district of Mayen-Koblenz in Rhineland-Palatinate, western Germany. It is the seat of the Verbandsgemeinde Rhein-Mosel.

Above the village are the two castles of Niederburg and Oberburg.

References

Municipalities in Rhineland-Palatinate
Mayen-Koblenz